J. Russell Townsend (October 1884 – December 8, 1969) was an American football and basketball coach.  He was the 21st head football coach at Wabash College in Crawfordsville, Indiana, serving for two seasons, from 1917 to 1918, and compiling a record of 2–9–1.  He was also the head basketball coach at Wabash from 1917 to 1919, tallying a mark of 16–14.

Townsend was a graduate of Coe College, where he played college football.  He died on December 8, 1969, at Winona Memorial Hospital in Indianapolis, Indiana.

Head coaching record

College football

References

1884 births
1969 deaths
American football ends
American football halfbacks
Coe Kohawks football players
Wabash Little Giants athletic directors
Wabash Little Giants baseball coaches
Wabash Little Giants basketball coaches
Wabash Little Giants football coaches
College track and field coaches in the United States
People from Tama County, Iowa